In Dreams is the fourth LP record by Roy Orbison with Monument Records recorded at the RCA Studio B in Nashville, Tennessee and released in 1963. It is named after the hit 45rpm single "In Dreams," which would go to Number One on the Australian singles chart in mid-1963. The same success belonged to "Blue Bayou," which became his very next chart-topper Down Under soon afterwards.
 
In 2004 Rolling Stone named the title song number 319 on their 500 Greatest Songs of All Time.

Track listing

References

Roy Orbison albums
1963 albums
Albums produced by Fred Foster
Monument Records albums